"It Is Well With My Soul" is a hymn penned by hymnist Horatio Spafford and composed by Philip Bliss. First published in Gospel Hymns No. 2 by Ira Sankey and Bliss (1876), it is possibly the most influential and enduring in the Bliss repertoire and is often taken as a choral model, appearing in hymnals of a wide variety of Christian fellowships.

Background
This hymn was written after traumatic events in Spafford's life. The first two were the death of his four-year-old son and the Great Chicago Fire of 1871, which ruined him financially (he had been a successful lawyer and had invested significantly in property in the area of Chicago that was extensively damaged by the great fire). His business interests were further hit by the economic downturn of 1873, at which time he had planned to travel to England with his family on the SS Ville du Havre, to help with D. L. Moody's upcoming evangelistic campaigns. In a late change of plan, he sent the family ahead while he was delayed on business concerning zoning problems following the Great Chicago Fire. While crossing the Atlantic Ocean, the ship sank rapidly after a collision with a sea vessel, the Loch Earn, and all four of Spafford's daughters died. His wife Anna survived and sent him the now famous telegram, "Saved alone …". Shortly afterwards, as Spafford traveled to meet his grieving wife, he was inspired to write these words as his ship passed near where his daughters had died. Bliss called his tune Ville du Havre, from the name of the stricken vessel.

Original lyrics 

When peace like a river, attendeth my way,
When sorrows like sea billows roll;
Whatever my lot, Thou hast taught me to know
It is well, it is well, with my soul.

Refrain
It is well, (it is well),
With my soul, (with my soul)
It is well, it is well, with my soul.

Though Satan should buffet, though trials should come,
Let this blest assurance control,
That Christ has regarded my helpless estate,
And hath shed His own blood for my soul.

My sin, oh, the bliss of this glorious thought!
My sin, not in part but the whole,
Is nailed to the cross, and I bear it no more,
Praise the Lord, praise the Lord, O my soul!

For me, be it Christ, be it Christ hence to live:
If Jordan above me shall roll,
No pang shall be mine, for in death as in life,
Thou wilt whisper Thy peace to my soul.

But Lord, 'tis for Thee, for Thy coming we wait,
The sky, not the grave, is our goal;
Oh, trump of the angel! Oh, voice of the Lord!
Blessed hope, blessed rest of my soul.

And Lord, haste the day when the faith shall be sight,
The clouds be rolled back as a scroll;
The trump shall resound, and the Lord shall descend,
A song in the night, oh my soul!

150th Anniversary 
2023 is the 150th anniversary of It Is Well with My Soul. Commemoration services are being planned to remember the actual day of the tragedy, Wednesday November 22  and a new edition of the book It Is Well with My Soul: from tragedy to trust has also been published in the anniversary year.

Notes

References

External links

 Library of Congress item mamcol.016 High resolution images of the restored original manuscript (up to 22 MB) front AND back at the Library of Congress. (Includes an extra verse on the back, as well as notes from his prayer meetings)
 SpaffordHymn.com The original Hymn manuscript
 The American Colony in Jerusalem (A Library of Congress Exhibition)
 McCann, Forrest Mason (1997). Hymns & History: An Annotated Survey of Sources. Abilene, Texas: ACU Press, pp. 327–328, 520, 597. 

American Christian hymns
19th-century hymns
2011 songs
2011 singles
Hillsong Worship songs